Artūrs Brūniņš (born July 13, 1982) is a Latvian professional basketball player. He plays primarily at the small forward position, but he can also play power forward if needed.

References

1982 births
Living people
BC Neptūnas players
BK Barons players
Latvian men's basketball players
People from Gulbene
Small forwards